Officio sanctissimo, subtitled "On The Church in Bavaria", was a papal encyclical published by Pope Leo XIII in 1887. It recalled the continuous history of Catholicism in Bavaria; and praised the people's resistance to the Kulturkampf. It also condemned Freemasonry, calling it a "sect of darkness."

See also  
 Papal Documents relating to Freemasonry
 Anti-Masonry
 Christianity and Freemasonry
 Catholicism and Freemasonry
 Clarification concerning status of Catholics becoming Freemasons
 List of encyclicals of Pope Leo XIII

References

External links
 Text of Officio sanctissimo

Catholicism and Freemasonry
History of Catholicism in Germany
1887 documents
1887 in Christianity
December 1887 events
1887 in Bavaria
Christianity in Bavaria
Encyclicals of Pope Leo XIII